The 2nd (Royal Naval) Brigade was an infantry brigade of the Royal Navy. It was assigned to the 63rd (Royal Naval) Division and served on the Western Front during the First World War.

The brigade was first raised in August 1914. By April 1915 it was known as 2nd (Royal Naval) Brigade. In July 1915, the Brigade was broken up, then reformed on 2 August 1915 and re-designated 2nd Brigade. It was further re-designated the 2nd (Royal Naval) Brigade and the 189th Brigade in July 1916.

Formation
The infantry battalions did not all serve at once, but all were assigned to the brigade during the war.
 5th (Nelson) Battalion
 6th (Howe) Battalion
 7th (Hood) Battalion
 8th (Anson) Battalion
 Chatham & Deal Battalion
 Portsmouth & Plymouth Battalion
 2/2nd Battalion, London Regiment
 2nd (Hawke) Battalion
 4th (Collingwood) Battalion
 1st (Drake) Battalion
 189th Machine Gun Company
 189th Trench Mortar Battery

References

Infantry brigades of the British Army in World War I